Artigarvan (from , meaning "height of Garbhan's house") is a village and townland in County Tyrone, Northern Ireland. It is 3 miles from Strabane and 4 miles from Dunnamanagh, within the Strabane District Council area. It is called Airtigarvan in Ulster-Scots.

LacPatrick is located in Artigarvan, having previously been known as Leckpatrick Creamery and TMC Daries Ltd

Artigarvan Townland
The townland is situated in the historic barony of Strabane Lower and the civil parish of Leckpatrick and covers an area of 175 acres.

Demographics

The population of the townland declined during the 19th century:

In the 2011 census the population of Artigarvan ward was 2,760.
99.09% were from the white ethnic group;
51.05% belong to or were brought up in a 'Protestant and Other Christian (including Christian related) religion and 46.96% belong to or were brought up in the Catholic religion.
46.99% indicated that they had a British national identity, 29.20% had an Irish national identity, and 31.09% had a Northern Irish national identity.

See also
List of townlands of County Tyrone

References

Villages in County Tyrone
Townlands of County Tyrone
Barony of Strabane Lower